Haunted is a fantasy novel written by Kelley Armstrong.

Synopsis
Haunted, the fifth in the Women of the Otherworld series, is a novel written by Kelley Armstrong featuring Eve Levine. Half-demon, black witch and devoted mother, Eve has been dead for three years. However, whilst the afterlife isn't too bad, Eve is desperate to find a way to communicate with her daughter, Savannah, now the ward of Paige Winterbourne and Lucas Cortez.

The Fates, though, have other plans, and they call in a favour. An evil spirit called the Nix has escaped from hell. Feeding on chaos and death, she is an expert at persuading people to kill for her. The Fates want Eve to hunt her down before she does any more damage. The Nix is a dangerous enemy, however. Previous hunters have been sent mad in the process.

Detailed synopsis
Eve Levine has spent her afterlife watching over her daughter, Savannah, and is frustrated, now that she is dead, by her inability to help her. However, she is prevented from continuing this obsession when the Fates call in the favour she owes them for saving the lives of Paige and Lucas (Industrial Magic). She is to track down the Nix, a demi-demon with a penchant for chaos whose particular trick is to provide the will power women need to commit murder.

Assisted by her lover, Kristof Nast, and the Angel Trsiel, Eve sets out to hunt the Nix. But the demi-demon will not be easy prey. Using Jaime Vegas to contact the Nix's previous partners, Eve discovers that the Nix is willing to go to any lengths to secure the chaos she feeds upon—putting the people Eve cares about most at risk. Eve must stop her before it is too late, even if that means taking the last resort—becoming an Ascended Angel and giving up her life with Kristof.

Characters

Main characters
 Eve Levine - Witch, Aspicio Half-demon and mother of Savannah. Now dead.
 Fates, The - Deities in charge of the afterlife (see Moirai).
 Jaime Vegas - Necromancer.
 Kristof Nast - Sorcerer father of Savannah. Now dead.
 Lucas Cortez - Sorcerer Lawyer and husband of Paige Winterbourne, Son of Benicio Cortez and heir of Cortez Cabal. 
 Nix, The—Demi-demon.
 Paige Winterbourne - Witch and Former Head of American Coven. Wife of Lucas Cortez.
 Savannah Levine - Fifteen-year-old witch and ward of Paige Winterbourne and daughter of Eve Levine (Witch & Aspicio half Demon) & Kristof Nast (Sorcerer & heir to Nast Cabal).
 Trsiel - Angel charged with the task of assisting Eve.

Allusions/references to actual history, geography and current science
 Eliot Ness (April 19, 1903 – May 16, 1957) was an American Prohibition agent famous for his efforts to enforce Prohibition in Chicago, Illinois, as the leader of a legendary team nicknamed The Untouchables. His inability to capture the Cleveland Torso Murderer (said in the novel to be surgeon Agnes Miller, assisted by the Nix) may have contributed to his exit from what was otherwise a reasonably successful career in Cleveland.

"The Nix didn't ask who the "arrogant boy" was... she didn't want to sit through another diatribe on the ineptitude and inexperience of Eliot Ness. The year before, Mayor Burton had appointed the young man as Cleveland's safety director, head of the police and fire departments." (p. 154)

 Lizzie Borden (July 19, 1860 – June 1, 1927) was a New England spinster and a central figure in the case surrounding the brutal axe double-murder of her father and stepmother on a sweltering day, August 4, 1892, in Fall River, Massachusetts. The case was memorialized in a popular jump-rope rhyme, which also features on p. 183 of the novel:

 Lizzie Borden took an axe
 And gave her mother forty whacks.
 When she saw what she had done,
 She gave her father forty-one.

 Glamis Castle is situated beside the village of Glamis  in Angus, Scotland. Glamis Castle was the childhood home of Elizabeth Bowes-Lyon, best known as the Queen Elizabeth The Queen Mother. Her daughter, Princess Margaret, was born there. The legend of the Monster of Glamis is in this novel related to the demon Dantalian.
 Marie-Madeleine-Marguerite d'Aubray, Marquise de Brinvilliers (1630 – July 17, 1676) was a French serial killer.

External links
Author's website

References

2005 Canadian novels
2005 fantasy novels
Novels by Kelley Armstrong
Viking Press books
Ghost narrator